The 2007 Grand Prix SAR La Princesse Lalla Meryem was a women's tennis tournament played on outdoor clay courts in Fés, Morocco that was part of the Tier IV category of the 2007 WTA Tour. It was the seventh edition of the tournament and was held from 14 May until 20 May 2007. Unseeded Milagros Sequera won the singles title.

Finals

Singles

 Milagros Sequera defeated  Aleksandra Wozniak 6–1, 6–3
 It was the only WTA singles title of Sequera's career.

Doubles

 Vania King /  Sania Mirza defeated  Andreea Ehritt-Vanc /  Anastasia Rodionova 6–1, 6–2

External links
 ITF tournament edition details
 Tournament draws

Grand Prix Sar La Princesse Lalla Meryem
Morocco Open
2007 in Moroccan tennis